Lamrabih is a small village in the region of Rabat-Salé-Kénitra, Morocco. At the time of the 2004 census, the commune had a total population of 20,187 people.

References

Populated places in Sidi Kacem Province
Rural communes of Rabat-Salé-Kénitra